Tom Willis (born 18 January 1999) is an English professional rugby union player.

Played for Reading Abbey RFC in his youth (where both his father Steve and brother Jack played), was part of a team that were excellent in both of the A&B local leagues

Career
Willis is the brother of Jack Willis, a fellow Wasps teammate. In October 2017 he made his Premiership debut for Wasps against Saracens.

Willis was included in the England under-20 squad for the 2018 World Rugby Under 20 Championship and came off the bench in the final as England finished runners up to hosts France. He was also a member of the side that finished fifth at the 2019 World Rugby Under 20 Championship and scored the winning try in a game against Ireland.

Wasps entered administration on 17 October 2022 and Willis was made redundant along with all other players and coaching staff. In November 2022, he signed for Bordeaux Bègles.

References

1999 births
Living people
English rugby union players
Rugby union players from Reading, Berkshire
Wasps RFC players
Rugby union number eights